Kiril Petrunov (born 1900, date of death unknown) was a Bulgarian sprinter. He competed in the men's 400 metres at the 1924 Summer Olympics.

References

External links
 

1900 births
Year of death missing
Athletes (track and field) at the 1924 Summer Olympics
Bulgarian male sprinters
Bulgarian male long jumpers
Bulgarian male triple jumpers
Olympic athletes of Bulgaria
Place of birth missing